Hylaeus krombeini is a bee species endemic to Asia.

References

 http://animaldiversity.org/accounts/Hylaeus_krombeini/classification/
 https://www.itis.gov/servlet/SingleRpt/SingleRpt?search_topic=TSN&search_value=755047
 http://apoidea.lifedesks.org/pages/11865

Colletidae
Hymenoptera of Asia
Insects described in 1980